Mount Davraz, also sometimes cited as Mount Davras, is a mountain and a winter sports and ski resort in the Taurus Mountains in Isparta Province in southern Turkey.

There are black, red, blue and yellow runs, so there are facilities for all levels of skiers. Access to the slopes is via drag and chair lifts - depending on the particular run.

The resort is open from December 1 each year, although the main period of winter sports varies with the snow conditions, which usually means from the first week in January.

Davraz is served by one main hotel, Sirene Davras Ski and Wellness Hotel.

Gallery

External links

 Southern Turkey Winter Sports
 www.davraz.com Official site of Sirene Davras Ski
 www.davraz.com.tr Official site of the ski resort
 www.davras.com General information

Landforms of Isparta Province
Davraz
Ski areas and resorts in Turkey
Tourist attractions in Isparta Province